The Port Orford News is a weekly newspaper published in Port Orford on the coast of the U.S. state of Oregon since 1926.

Established by George W. Soranson in 1926, the News has been credited with promoting the development of Port Orford.

In 2005 Matt Hall, co-owner and editor of the News, went to New Orleans to help with Hurricane Katrina relief efforts.  Portland-based Beacon Communication bought the News in 2006 from the Halls, who had owned it since 2003. By 2013, the Halls were again the owners; in that year, the couple also bought the Myrtle Point Herald, and were also considering purchasing the Coquille Sentinel.

The University of Oregon Library has archives of the News.

Current issues of the newspaper are available online at portorfordnews.net.

References

External links 
 https://books.google.com/books?id=5HfvIwIOIa4C&pg=PA51&dq=%22Port+Orford+News%22&hl=en&sa=X&ved=0ahUKEwik0d7sov3cAhVUFzQIHaArBVoQ6AEILDAB#v=onepage&q=%22Port%20Orford%20News%22&f=false
 https://www.thefreelibrary.com/News+People.-a0174296821
 https://chroniclingamerica.loc.gov/lccn/sn00063602/ and https://chroniclingamerica.loc.gov/lccn/sn00063600/
Official website

Newspapers published in Oregon
Port Orford, Oregon
1926 establishments in Oregon
Publications established in 1926